Poolesville is a U.S. town in the western portion of Montgomery County, Maryland. The population was 5,742 at the 2020 United States Census. It is surrounded by (but is technically not part of) the Montgomery County Agricultural Reserve, and is considered a distant bedroom community for commuters to Washington, D.C.

The name of the town comes from the brothers John Poole, Sr. and Joseph Poole, Sr. who owned land and slaves in what is now Poolesville.  Due to an historical anomaly, until 2010 the legal name of the town was "The Commissioners of Poolesville".  Residents overwhelmingly voted to formally change the name to "The Town of Poolesville" in the November 2010 general election.

History
In 1760, brothers John Poole, Sr. and Joseph Poole, Sr. purchased  acres in the area that is now Poolesville.  Thirty-three years later, John Poole, Jr. used a  tract that he inherited from his father to build a log store and subdivided the tract, selling portions to a number of other merchants. The settlement grew from there and was incorporated in 1867.

During the Civil War, Union military leaders realized that the shallow fords of the Potomac River posed a threat to the capital city. At certain times of the year, the Potomac River is shallow enough to cross and thus thousands of troops were moved to both Darnestown and Poolesville. The Corps of Observation was established just outside Poolesville and soldiers were stationed near the river to monitor potential Confederate incursions into Maryland. During the winter of 1861–1862, it is estimated that 20,000 Union troops were stationed in or around the town. There were no battles fought in Poolesville; however, the infamous Battle of Ball's Bluff was fought nearby on October 21, 1861. Hundreds of Union soldiers who were stationed in Poolesville were killed in this battle that was badly managed by inexperienced Union generals.

There were several Confederate raids into the town during the war, and the Confederate Army invaded Maryland by crossing the Potomac near Poolesville in 1862 and 1864. The old Poolesville Methodist Church cemetery contains the remains of approximately twenty soldiers who either were killed in action at Ball's Bluff or who died of illness while in camp.

The Seneca Schoolhouse, a small one-room schoolhouse of red sandstone, was built in Poolesville in 1866 to educate the children of the stone cutters who worked at the Seneca Quarry. Operating as the Seneca Schoolhouse Museum, it provides tours to schoolchildren so that they can experience a typical school day as it would have been on March 13, 1880.

The Kunzang Palyul Choling Buddhist temple opened in Poolesville in 1985.

The Poolesville Historic District was listed in 1975 on the National Register of Historic Places.

Geography
Poolesville is located at  (39.140540, -77.408461).

Poolesville lies off Montgomery County's main axis of suburban development along the Interstate 270 and Maryland State Route 355 corridor, separated from the contiguous Maryland suburbs of Washington by the rural lands of the county agricultural reserve, where new housing and commercial starts are restricted.

Government
Poolesville is governed by five commissioners elected in staggered 4-year terms.  Commissioners are not paid.  The commissioners elect among themselves a president (known informally as "the mayor") and vice president.  A Town Manager is responsible for the day-to-day operations of the town. Six Boards and Commissions assist the commissioners: the Planning Commission, Parks Board, Board of Elections, Sign Review Board, Board of Zoning Appeals, and Ethics Commission.

Demographics

2000 census
As of the census of 2000, there were 5,151 people, 1,601 households, and 1,402 families residing in the town. The racial makeup of the town in 2000 was 93.57% White, 2.85% African American, 0.49% Native American, 1.09% Asian, 1.4% from other races, and 1.28% from two or more races. Hispanic or Latino of any race were 2.68% of the population.

There were 1,601 households, out of which 56.8% had children under the age of 18 living with them, 75.6% were married couples living together, 9.0% had a female householder with no husband present, and 12.4% were non-families. 9.3% of all households were made up of individuals, and 2.0% had someone living alone who was 65 years of age or older. The average household size was 3.22 and the average family size was 3.44.

In the town, the population was spread out, with 35.0% under the age of 18, 5.6% from 18 to 24, 32.2% from 25 to 44, 24.0% from 45 to 64, and 3.2% who were 65 years of age or older. The median age was 35 years. For every 100 females, there were 96.5 males. For every 100 females age 18 and over, there were 94.2 males.

The median income for a household in the town was $85,092, and the median income for a family was $88,916. Males had a median income of $60,596 versus $42,051 for females. The per capita income for the town was $30,211. About 2.5% of families and 2.6% of the population were below the poverty line, including 3.0% of those under age 18 and 7.5% of those age 65 or over.

2010 census
As of the census of 2010, there were 4,883 people, 1,602 households, and 1,348 families residing in the town. The racial makeup of the town was 88.4% White, 5.2% African American, 0.5% Native American, 2.1% Asian, 1.4% from other races, and 2.5% from two or more races. Hispanic or Latino of any race were 7.0% of the population.

There were 1,602 households, of which 45.4% had children under the age of 18 living with them, 71.0% were married couples living together, 8.8% had a female householder with no husband present, 4.4% had a male householder with no wife present, and 15.9% were non-families. 12.2% of all households were made up of individuals, and 3% had someone living alone who was 65 years of age or older. The average household size was 3.04 and the average family size was 3.30.

The median age in the town was 41.5 years. 27.7% of residents were under the age of 18; 8.6% were between the ages of 18 and 24; 19.2% were from 25 to 44; 38.4% were from 45 to 64; and 6.1% were 65 years of age or older. The gender makeup of the town was 49.2% male and 50.8% female.

Education
Poolesville is served by Montgomery County Public Schools.  Three schools are located in Poolesville: Poolesville High School, John Poole Middle School, and Poolesville Elementary School. Monacacy Elementary School in Dickerson also feeds into John Poole MS.

Transportation

Two state highways serve Poolesville. Maryland Route 107 extends southeast from the center of town, joining Maryland Route 28 on its way to Rockville. Maryland Route 109 proceeds northeast from the center of town, intersecting MD 28 on its way to Interstate 270 in Hyattstown.

Notable people
 Thomas Plater, U.S. Congressman for Maryland's 3rd District, 1801–1805, died in Poolesville.
 Elijah V. White, (1832-1907) Confederate commander of the 35th Battalion of Virginia Cavalry (White's Commanches) during the American Civil War. White was born in the area of Poolesville.

References

External links

 
 U.S. Census data

1760 establishments in Maryland
1760 establishments in the Thirteen Colonies
1867 establishments in Maryland
Towns in Montgomery County, Maryland
Towns in Maryland
Populated places established in 1760
Populated places established in 1867